The House at 1339 Cummings Road is a single-family home located in Davison, Michigan. It was listed on the National Register of Historic Places in 1982.

This house was built some time between 1840 and 1860. It is a vernacular Greek Revival structure with an unusual three-part massing. The house consists of a -story rectangular mass with a one-story salt box addition at the rear and a hip roofed, single-story addition attached to the front facade. The front addition has corner pilasters, a recessed porch supported by turned uprights, and a simple entrance door in the porch. All three sections have a wide frieze and two have cornices with returns.

References

National Register of Historic Places in Genesee County, Michigan
Greek Revival architecture in Michigan